Pleurotomella simillima is a species of sea snail, a marine gastropod mollusk in the family Raphitomidae.

Description 
The length of the shell varies between 6 mm and 11 mm.

Distribution 
This marine species occurs in the Weddell Sea, Antarctica and off Visokoi Island, SE of island, South Sandwich Islands, South Atlantic Ocean at a depth between 93 m and 600 m.

References

External links 

 Die antarktischen Schnecken und Muscheln, In: Deutsche Südpolar-Expedition 1901–1903 (Erich von Drygalski, E.v. ed.), vol. 8, No. 5, Georg Reimer, Berlin.
 Kantor Y.I., Harasewych M.G. & Puillandre N. (2016). A critical review of Antarctic Conoidea (Neogastropoda). Molluscan Research. 36(3): 153-206
 
  Griffiths, H.J.; Linse, K.; Crame, J.A. (2003). SOMBASE – Southern Ocean mollusc database: a tool for biogeographic analysis in diversity and evolution. Organisms Diversity and Evolution. 3: 207-213
 Gastropods.com: Pleurotomella (Anomalotomella) simillima
 Biolib.cz: image

simillima
Gastropods described in 1912